The siege of Constantinople (1235) was a joint Bulgarian–Nicaean siege on the capital of the Latin Empire. Latin emperor John of Brienne was besieged by the Nicaean emperor John III Doukas Vatatzes and Tsar Ivan Asen II of Bulgaria.

Prelude
After Robert of Courtenay died in 1228, a new regency under John of Brienne was set up. After the disastrous Epirote defeat by the Bulgarians at the Battle of Klokotnitsa, the Epirote threat to the Latin Empire was removed, only to be replaced by Nicaea, which started acquiring territories in Greece. Emperor John III Doukas Vatatzes of Nicaea concluded an alliance with Bulgaria, which in 1235 resulted in a joint campaign against the Latin Empire.

The siege
In 1235, Angelo Sanudo,  the second Duke of the Archipelago, sent a naval squadron for the defense of Constantinople, where the Emperor John of Brienne was being besieged by John III Doukas Vatatzes, Emperor of Nicaea, and Ivan Asen II of Bulgaria. The joint Bulgarian-Nicaean siege was unsuccessful. The allies retreated in the autumn because of the incoming winter. Ivan Asen II and Vatatzes agreed to continue the siege in the next year, but the Bulgarian Emperor later refused to send troops. With the death of John of Brienne in 1237, the Bulgarians broke the treaty with Vatatzes because of the prospect that Ivan Asen II could become a regent of the Latin Empire .

Aftermath
By 1247, the Nicaeans had effectively surrounded Constantinople, with only the city's strong walls holding them at bay, and the Battle of Pelagonia in 1258 signaled the beginning of the end of Latin predominance in Greece. Thus, on July 25, 1261, with most of the Latin troops away on campaign, the Nicaean general Alexios Strategopoulos found an unguarded entrance to the city, and entered it with his troops, restoring the Byzantine Empire for his master, Michael VIII Palaiologos.

See also
 Siege of Constantinople (1203)
 Siege of Constantinople (1204)
 Siege of Constantinople (1260)

References

Bibliography

External links
 The Latin Occupation in the Greek Lands – The Latin Empire, from the Foundation of the Hellenic World

1235
Battles involving the Latin Empire
Sieges involving the Second Bulgarian Empire
13th century in Bulgaria
Constantinople 1235
Conflicts in 1235
Bulgarian–Latin Wars
Sieges of the Crusades